The 2021 Liberal Democratic Party leadership election was held on 29 September 2021 to elect the next president of the Liberal Democratic Party of Japan. The winner of the election, Fumio Kishida, became the prime minister of Japan, and led the party into the 2021 Japanese general election.

Incumbent party President and Prime Minister Yoshihide Suga announced on 3 September that he would not run for re-election, amid low approval ratings and media reports of dissension within the party. Suga was initially elected President of the LDP in 2020 to serve the rest of former Prime Minister Shinzo Abe's term after Abe resigned in August 2020 due to health issues.

Former Minister for Foreign Affairs Fumio Kishida won the election in a second round runoff, defeating opponent Taro Kono, the incumbent Minister for Administrative Reform and Regulatory Reform. Kishida's victory was driven by strong support among LDP Diet members, while Kono led polling prior to the election and won the most votes from dues-paying party members. Kishida was confirmed by the Diet as Japan's 100th Prime Minister on 4 October 2021.

Background
Shinzo Abe was elected President of the LDP three consecutive times in 2012, 2015 and 2018 following a rule change in 2017 which extended the office's term limit to three consecutive terms instead of two. Abe successfully led the LDP to three consecutive general election victories in 2012, 2014 and 2017 and became the longest-serving Prime Minister in Japanese history. On 28 August 2020, Abe suddenly announced that he would resign as Prime Minister and LDP President following a resurgence of his ulcerative colitis.

Chief Cabinet Secretary Yoshihide Suga won the party's special election in September 2020 to serve the remainder of Abe's term as LDP President, with Suga subsequently entering office as Prime Minister on 16 September. Suga had initially announced that he would run for re-election for a full term as LDP President in advance of the 2021 general election. On 3 September 2021, Suga reversed course and announced that he would not run for re-election as LDP President, amid poor approval ratings and media reports of internal dissension within the party regarding Suga's leadership.

Suga's withdrawal from the race as well as the fact that most of the LDP's internal factions have declined to endorse a specific candidate led to the election being described as wide open and unpredictable.

Election procedure
The election process for the President of the LDP is established in the "Rules for the Election of President of the Party". In order to officially qualify as a candidate in the election, a candidate must be an LDP member of the National Diet and must receive a nomination from at least 20 fellow LDP Diet members.

The LDP selects its leader via a two-round election involving both LDP members of the Diet and dues-paying party members from across Japan. In the first round, all LDP members of the Diet cast one vote while party member votes are translated proportionally into votes equaling the other half of the total ballots. If any candidate wins a majority (over 50%) of votes in the first round, that candidate is elected President.

If no candidate receives a majority of votes in the first round, a runoff is held immediately between the top two candidates. In the runoff, all Diet members vote again while the 47 prefectural chapters of the LDP get one vote each, with the result of the latter votes determined using the first round results of party members in each prefecture. The candidate who wins the most votes in the runoff is then elected President.

The party's secretary general can decide to organise the election with the rule of the second round only, as was decided in 2020, but didn't as for 2021.

Candidates

Declared

Withdrawn

Declined
 Shinzo Abe, Prime Minister (2006–2007, 2012–2020), Member of the House of Representatives, (1996–present) Chief Cabinet Secretary (2005–2006) (endorsed Takaichi)
 Taro Aso, Prime Minister (2008–2009), Deputy Prime Minister (2012–2021), Member of the House of Representatives, (1979–1983, 1986–present), Minister for Foreign Affairs (2005–2007), Minister for Internal Affairs and Communications, (2003–2005)
 Shigeru Ishiba, Member of the House of Representatives (1986–present), Minister for Overcoming Population Decline and Vitalizing Local Economy (2014–2016), Minister of Agriculture, Forestry and Fisheries (2008–2009), Minister of Defense (2007–2008) (endorsed Kono)
Shinjirō Koizumi, Member of the House of Representatives for Kanagawa 11th district (2009–present), Minister of the Environment (2019–2021), son of former Prime Minister Junichiro Koizumi. (endorsed Kono)
 Toshimitsu Motegi, Minister for Foreign Affairs (2019–2021), Member of the House of Representatives (1993–present), former Minister of Economy, Trade and Industry (2012–2014) and Secretary General of the LDP (since 2021)
 Toshihiro Nikai, Member of the House of Representatives (1983–present), Secretary General of the LDP (2016-2021), Minister of Transport (1999–2000), Minister of Economy, Trade and Industry (2005–2006, 2008–2009)
 Hakubun Shimomura, Member of the House of Representatives (1996–present), Minister of Education, Culture, Sports, Science and Technology (2012–2015)

Endorsements

Opinion polling

Results

Aftermath
After Prime Minister Suga announced his resignation, Kono was heavily favored to win the election as he was in first place among many LDP polls leading up to the election. His campaign was endorsed by Suga and other high ranking LDP members, but Kishida narrowly won the first round of the election and ultimately defeated Kono in the run-off.

After being elected, Kishida's victory was labelled as a win for the party's "technocrats establishment". Kishida was seen by many LDP members as a stable choice to succeed Suga rather than a rapid change. Kono was seen as a candidate of change. Kishida vowed not to increase the consumption tax rates in Japan and reviewing the pension and health-care system in the country. He has said that his main focus would be to focus on income redistribution to address income inequality.

U.S. President Joe Biden congratulated Kishida and looked "forward to working with [Kishida] to strengthen our cooperation in the years ahead".

President of Taiwan Tsai Ing-wen congratulated Kishida after he was elected Prime Minister of Japan.

Notes

References

External links 
 YouTube, LDP channel: 自民党総裁選2021 (Jimintō sōsaisen 2021, "LDP presidential election 2021") playlist with election-related formalities (election commission announcements, official candidate registration/nomination procedure, (scheduled) delegate/MP voting & count) and the LDP-sponsored online debates and interviews
 NHK, Nichiyō Tōron (NHK's political Sunday talk show): Episode 2021/9/19 with the four candidates for LDP president as guests (full video is only accessible via NHK+ domestically)

2021 elections in Japan
2021 Liberal Democratic Party
2021 leadership election
September 2021 events in Japan
Liberal Democratic Party (Japan) leadership election